Bubbling Spring is an unincorporated community in Hampshire County in the U.S. state of West Virginia. Bubbling Spring is situated on Cacapon River Road (West Virginia Secondary Route 14) along the Cacapon River, south of Capon Bridge and north of Hooks Mills. It takes its name from the Bubbling Spring on the Cacapon there. Bubbling Spring has been known as Bubbling Spring Camps, Cacapon Bubbling Spring Camps, and Crystal Spring.

References

Unincorporated communities in Hampshire County, West Virginia
Unincorporated communities in West Virginia